Erioscirpus is a genus of flowering plants belonging to the family Cyperaceae.

Its native range is Iran to China.

Species:

Erioscirpus comosus 
Erioscirpus microstachyus

References

Cyperaceae
Cyperaceae genera